There are numerous codes of football in South Australia.

The peak State based Australian rules football competition is the South Australian National Football League. See Also: Australian rules football in South Australia
For soccer see Football (soccer) in South Australia
For rugby league see South Australia Rugby League